Bistricë (definite: Bistrica) is a river in southwestern Albania. It ends in the Ionian Sea.

Etymology 
The name Bistrica comes from Slavic, meaning "clear (water)". Other toponyms including "Bistrica" in Balkan countries indicate the Slavic origin of the toponym.

Geography
Bistricë starts from Mali i Gjerë (also known as Sopot) in Finiq municipality directing initially versus south-west. The main source is near Krongj ("The Blue Eye" source), also gathering other sources from the nearby villages of Pecë, Kardhikaq, Velahovë, and other smaller brooks. It passes through Mesopotam and Finiq municipalities, parallel with the Sarandë-Gjirokastër road.

Initially the river ended in Lake Butrint, which connects with the Ionian sea through the Vivar channel. In 1958, it was deviated to Çukë channel.

The river is 25 km long.

Economy and tourism
The river is not navigable. There is an artificial lake with the same name built on its basin, and three hydro-power stations built in the '60. The river's waters are used to a certain extent as a supply for the nearby fields of Vurg area. All the stations passed through the privatization process from 2010 with plenty of controversies.
A well known touristic place is the "Azure Eye", often referred as "Blue Eye", a spring tributary to Bistrica river near the village named Krongj, with a rich flora and fauna.

See also
List of rivers in Albania
List of lakes of Albania
Tourism in Albania
Hydroelectricity in Albania

Sources
Sjöberg, Örjan. "A Contribution to the Geography of Hydro-Electric Power Generation in Albania", Osterreichische Osthefte [Vienna], 29, No. 1, 1987, 5-27. ISSN 0029-9375
Mevlan Kabos; Eshref Pumo; Farudin Krutaj. "Gjeografia fizike e Shqipërisë : në dy vëllime", Qendra e Studimeve Gjeografike (Akademia e Shkencave e RPS të Shqipërisë), 1990–1991, 112. OCLC 38055712

References

External links
Geography

Rivers of Albania
Drainage basins of the Ionian Sea
Geography of Vlorë County